Alone with Everybody is the first solo album by English singer-songwriter Richard Ashcroft, released via Hut Records in June 2000 (see 2000 in British music).
The songs "A Song for the Lovers", "C'mon People (We're Making It Now)" and "New York" were initially recorded with the Verve for their 1997 album Urban Hymns, but were never released.

Release and reception

Upon its release, critical response to Alone with Everybody was generally positive. NME concluded its review by stating that "Ashcroft's newly discovered stability has done nothing to blunt his powers of communication or reduce his belief in the apocalyptic potential of music". At Metacritic, which assigns a normalized rating out of 100 to reviews from mainstream critics, the album has received an average score of 70, based on 20 reviews.

Track listing
All lyrics and music by Richard Ashcroft.

"A Song for the Lovers" – 5:26
"I Get My Beat" – 6:02
"Brave New World" – 5:59
"New York" – 5:30
"You on My Mind in My Sleep" – 5:06
"Crazy World" – 4:57
"On a Beach" – 5:09
"Money to Burn" – 6:15
"Slow Was My Heart" – 3:44
"C'mon People (We're Making It Now)" – 5:03
"Everybody" – 6:34
Bonus tracks
  "Leave Me High" – 5:22
"XXYY" – 4:24
The two bonus tracks feature on the Japanese version of the album and were originally released as B-sides for the UK single "Money to Burn".

Personnel
Richard Ashcroft – co-producer, vocals, guitar, percussion, keyboards, piano, mellotron, organ, melodica

Additional musicians
Peter Salisbury – drums
Pino Palladino – bass
Steve Sidelnyk – percussion, programming, drums
Chuck Leavell – piano, Hammond organ
Duncan Mackay – trumpet
Lucinda Barry – harp
Teena Lyle – vibes
Chris Potter – bass
Jim Hunt – saxophone, flute
Jane Pickles – flute
Anna Noakes – flute
Judd Lander – harmonica
B. J. Cole – pedal steel guitar
Kate Radley – keyboards
Craig Wagstaff – congas
Philip D Todd – saxophone
Nigel Hitchcock – saxophone
Jamie Talbot – baritone saxophone
John Barclay – trumpet
Stuart Brooks – trumpet
Will Malone – brass arrangement, string arrangement, conducting
The London Session Orchestra – strings
The London Community Gospel Choir – vocals
Samantha Smith, Leonard Meade, Vernetta Meade, Michelle-John Douglas, Donovan Lawrence, Irene Myrtle Forrester

Technical personnel
Chris Potter – producer

Release details

References

External links
 
[ Billboard.com – Discography – Richard Ashcroft – Alone with Everybody] at Billboard.com

Richard Ashcroft albums
2000 debut albums
Albums produced by Chris Potter (record producer)
Hut Records albums
Virgin Records albums